Frederick Warren Pitt  (born 14 March 1948) is an Australian politician. He was a Labor member of the Legislative Assembly of Queensland from 1989 to 1995 and 1998 to 2009.

Early life
Born in Cairns, Pitt was a school teacher before entering politics. He underwent national service and was an army reservist from 1969 to 1975 and was active in the local community, being recognised as Mulgrave Shire Citizen of the Year in 1983.

Political career
Pitt was elected to state parliament as the member for Mulgrave at the 1989 state election defeating sitting National Party MP Max Menzel. Pitt was himself defeated two terms later at the 1995 state election by the Nationals' Naomi Wilson.  Pitt sought a rematch at the 1998 state election, but leakage of Coalition preferences allowed Charles Rappolt of One Nation to defeat Pitt.

Rappolt resigned only four months into his term, and Pitt narrowly defeated Wilson in the resulting by-election, providing Labor Premier Peter Beattie with a majority in his own right (previously Beattie's government had to rely on the support of independent MP Peter Wellington).

Fortuitously, Pitt served all his time in parliament as a member of the majority party. Consequently, he served in a number of government roles. In the government of Wayne Goss, Pitt served as Deputy Government Whip from March to October 1992, Government Whip from October 1992 to February 1995, and Minister for Business, Industry and Regional Development from February to July 1995.

In the government of Peter Beattie, Pitt served as Chair of the Scrutiny of Legislation Committee from May 2001 to January 2004 until he became Minister for Communities and Disability Services in February 2004. He retained the portfolio for years to come, and to his responsibilities were added: Seniors in April 2004, Youth in September 2006, and Aboriginal and Torres Strait Islander Partnerships in January 2007. That gave Pitt the unusually long title of "Minister for Communities, Disability Services, Aboriginal and Torres Strait Islander Partnerships, Seniors and Youth", which he retained until Beattie's retirement in September 2007.

In the government of Anna Bligh, Pitt served as Minister for Main Roads and Local Government from September 2007 until his retirement in February 2009.

Upon his retirement, Pitt's son Curtis was preselected as the Labor candidate in the district of Mulgrave. Curtis Pitt successfully retained the seat for the Labor Party at the 2009 state election

References

                   

1948 births
Living people
Members of the Queensland Legislative Assembly
Australian Labor Party members of the Parliament of Queensland
Members of the Order of Australia
21st-century Australian politicians